Bada Malhera, is a town in the Chhatarpur district of the state of Madhya Pradesh, India.

Demographics
The total area of Bada Malhera is 623 km2, consisting of 596.07 km2 of rural area and 27.16 km2 of urban area. According to a nationwide census held in 2001, Bada Malhera's population is 53% male and 47% female, with a total population of 15,042. The population of children under 6 years of age is 18%, higher than the national average of 13.2%. Bada Malhera's average literacy rate is estimated at 56%, just below the 59.5% national average with 61% of males and 39% females considered functionally illiterate.

State Representation
Bada Malhera comes under the Malhara Vidhan Sabha constituency. As of December 2020, its representative in Madhya Pradesh's Legislative Assembly is Pradyuman Singh Lodhi.

Tourism

Nearby places of interest 
 Khajuraho
 Dhubela
 Chhatarpur
 Bheem Kund, Bajna
 Cave of Sadwa

Transport

By road  

Bada Malhera is situated on the Kanpur-Sagar National Highway 146.

By train 

The nearest railway stations are at Chhatarpur (55 km), Teekamgarh (65 km), Khajuraho (95 km), Harpalpur (105 km), Jhansi (175 km), Mauranipur (105 km), Sagar (110 km), and Satna (190 km).

Education 

Bada Malhera has a college affiliated with the University of Sagar (Dr. Hari Singh Gour University), which offers graduate and post-graduate courses in arts, commerce, and education.

Economy 

There are few opportunities for employment in Bada Malhera, with the local economy mostly dependent on farming (some of the locals are well-known grain merchants). However, the town does have a growing private commercial sector, mainly in retail. As such, the town needs help from the State to keep businesses running.

Members of Legislative Assembly 

Constituency of Vindhya Pradesh:
1951: Basant Lal, Indian National Congress
Constituency of Madhya Pradesh:

1962: Hans Raj, Indian National Congress
1967: Govind Singh Ju Deo, Independent
1972: Dashrath, Indian National Congress
1977: Jang Bahadur Singh, Janata Party
1980: Kapur Chand Ghuwara, Communist Party of India
1985: Shivraj Singh, Bharatiya Janata Party
1990: Ashok Kumar, Bharatiya Janata Party
1993: Uma Yadav, Indian National Congress
1998: Swami Prasad, Bharatiya Janata Party
2003: Uma Bharti, Bharatiya Janata Party
2006 (by-election): Kapur Chand Ghuwara, Bharatiya Janata Party
2008: Rekha Yadav, Bharatiya Janshakti Party
2013: Rekha Yadav, Bharatiya Janta Party
2018: Pradumanya Singh Lodhi, Indian National Congress

List of villages 

 Andhiyara
 Arol
 Balya
 Baman Kola
 Bamni
 Bamnora Khurd
 Bandha
 Bandhar
 Bankpura
 Baraj
 Barethi
 Barkhera
 Barma
 Barsat
 Beeron
 Sadwa

References

Bundelkhand
Chhatarpur